The 1919 Manchester Rusholme by-election was a parliamentary by-election held in October 1919 for the British House of Commons constituency of Manchester Rusholme. The by-election was important for shaping the future Labour Party attitude to electoral relations with the Liberal Party.

Vacancy 
In September 1919 the Conservative MP Robert Burdon Stoker died. He had previously represented Manchester South since March 1918. At the 1918 general election he had been in receipt of the Coalition Government coupon.

Electoral history 
The seat was created for the 1918 general election partly out of the Unionist/Liberal marginal seat of Manchester South and partly out of the Liberal seat of Stretford. The result at the last general election was;

Candidates 
The Liberal party selected a new candidate in 45-year-old William Pringle, who had been Member of Parliament for North West Lanarkshire until the 1918 general election, when he had been defeated at Glasgow Springburn. 
There was speculation that Labour would not contest the election, allowing the Liberals a clear run at the Unionists. Since the general election, Lib-Lab co-operation, otherwise known as the progressive alliance had seen the two parties gain two Unionist seats each. One of Labour's leading figures, Arthur Henderson was sympathetic to such an arrangement. Henderson had himself been the beneficiary of Lib-Lab co-operation when the Liberals allowed him a straight fight with the Unionists at the 1919 Widnes by-election a month earlier. The Widnes seat neighboured Rusholme and the Liberals had been active in support of Henderson. The local Labour party insisted on fighting the seat and on 9 September announced a new candidate Dr. Robert Dunstan from Fulham, who had been a Liberal politician up until 1917. He had contested Birmingham Moseley at the previous election.
The Conservative party's new candidate was 32-year-old John Thorpe, who had not contested the 1918 general election. Thorpe was the eldest son of Ven. John Henry Thorpe, Archdeacon of Macclesfield. He had trained as a barrister. 
The Conservative party also now faced a challenge from the right when the National Party intervened with first time candidate Capt. Roger Crewdson.

Campaign
The election campaign took place during the great railway strike of 1919. Dunstan, the Labour candidate, sought to appeal to the centre ground by calling for widespread abolition of economic war-time restrictions. Pringle, the Liberal candidate, came out in support of Labour's policy of a capital levy, something that was not Liberal policy. It has been suggested that this stance may have cost him votes, lost to the Unionist candidate. Pringle advocated economic retrenchment to appeal to Unionist voters and also the nationalization of the railways and mines to appeal to Labour voters.

Result 
The turnout for the by-election was up on the last general election. The Unionists managed to hold the seat. Their support had fallen, but not much because of the intervention of the National Party. The Labour candidate did particularly well and pushed the Liberal candidate into third place.

The relative success of the Labour party in such a constituency encouraged them to field candidates in further Unionist/Liberal marginals rather than seek to reconstruct the Progressive Alliance.

Aftermath 
Thorpe sat until his defeat by the Liberals in 1923. His son Jeremy Thorpe, became Leader of the Liberal Party. Dunstan continued to be unsuccessful in his bid to enter Parliament. Pringle made a successful return to the House in 1922, winning Penistone for the Liberals. Crewdson's political career ended here. The result at the following general election saw the Liberals regain second place;

References

Manchester Rusholme by-election
Manchester Rusholme by-election
Rusholme
Manchester Rusholme by-election
1910s in Manchester